Tilemsi may refer to two communes in Mali:

Tilemsi, Gao
Tilemsi, Tombouctou